Lists of ambassadors of China may refer to:
Ambassador of China to Angola
Ambassador of China to Barbados
List of ambassadors from China to North Korea
List of ambassadors from China to South Korea
List of ambassadors of China to Albania
Chinese Ambassador to Lesotho
List of ambassadors of China to Malaysia
Chinese Ambassador to Montenegro
Chinese Ambassador to Nauru
Chinese Ambassador to Poland
Chinese Ambassador to Saint Kitts and Nevis
Chinese Ambassador to Saint Lucia
Chinese Ambassador to Saint Vincent and the Grenadines
Chinese Ambassador to Samoa
Chinese Ambassador to San Marino
Chinese Ambassador to São Tomé and Príncipe
Chinese Ambassador to Serbia
Chinese Ambassador to the Maldives

See also 
 Ambassadors of China

Lists of ambassadors by country of origin